Newbuild is the debut studio album by English electronic music group 808 State, released in September 1988 by Creed Records. It was the only album recorded with founding member Gerald Simpson, who departed shortly afterward for a solo career.

The group recorded the album on tape found discarded outside the BBC's Manchester studios because it did not meet the organization's quality requirements. The album was named after a local council housing project.

Reception and legacy

In a 1988 review, OffBeat described the album as "compulsive stuff, you don't exactly listen to it, more like feeel the frequencies... and respond." In 1999, Alternative Press called it an "artificial dystopia" in which the tracks "strip away the soul of Detroit techno and replace it with a cold and rhythmic paranoia."

Later techno artists Aphex Twin and Autechre have saluted the album as a major influence. The former reissued the album on his Rephlex label in 1999. He stated: "It was the next step after Chicago acid, and as much as I loved that, I could relate much better to 808 State. It seemed colder and more human at the same time." He also produced a remix of "Flow Coma", which appeared on his 2001 EP 2 Remixes by AFX.

A collection of unreleased material from the era was released in 2004 as Prebuild.

Track listing 
 "Sync/Swim"  – 6:20
 "Flow Coma"  – 6:01
 "Dr. Lowfruit (4 A.M. Mix)"  – 7:36
 "Headhunters"  – 5:02
 "Narcossa"  – 5:17
 "E Talk"  – 4:01
 "Compulsion"  – 5:22

Personnel
Performer, writer – Gerald Simpson, Graham Massey, Martin Price
Engineer – Graham Massey
Artwork – Metropark
Design – Johnson & Panas

References 

1988 debut albums
808 State albums